Cham Palaces and Hotels is a five star Syrian-based hotel chain. The chain has hotels in major Syrian cities and touristic spots, and has already expanded into neighboring Jordan.

Hotels

Syria
Apamee Cham Palace - Hama, Syria
Badia Cham Hotel - Deir ez-Zor, Syria
Bosra Cham Palace - Bosra, Syria
Cham Palace - Damascus, Syria
Ebla Cham Palace - Damascus, Syria
Fourat Cham Palace - Deir ez-Zor, Syria
Cote d'Azur de Cham Resort - Latakia, Syria
Cote d'Azur de Cham Residence - Latakia, Syria
Safita Cham Palace - Safita, Syria
Cham Golf and Country Club - Damascus, Syria

Jordan
Amman Cham Palace - Amman, Jordan

External links

Companies of Syria
Hotel chains
Syrian brands